Bolivian Spanish (or Castilian) is the variety of Spanish spoken by the majority of the population in Bolivia, either as a mother tongue or as a second language. Within the Spanish of Bolivia there are different regional varieties. In the border areas, Bolivia shares dialectal features with the neighboring countries.

Aspiration of syllable-final  is frequent in the lowlands, while in the highlands the sibilant  tends to be preserved, realized either as a laminal or, frequently, an apical .

Dialects of Spanish in Bolivia

Andean Spanish

Camba Spanish

This variety of Spanish is spoken on the Chaco-Beni plain and in the Santa Cruz valleys, a region that includes the departments of Santa Cruz, Beni, and Pando. Spanish is spoken by almost the entire population of these regions, and—like Spanish throughout the Americas—has its basis in Andalusian Spanish and Canarian Spanish, but with influences of native languages such as Chiquitano, Chané and Guarani, as well as Old World languages including Portuguese and Arabic. And although it is fairly uniform across regions and social classes, there are subtle geographical differences.

This dialect is characterized by the debuccalization ("aspiration") of final . For example, the word pues is pronounced . For the second-person-singular pronoun and verb forms, the use of "voseo" is dominant. The use of diminutive -ingo and the augmentative -ango is unique to this dialect. For example: chiquitingo ("very small") and grandango ("very large").

Loanwords from Chiquitano or from an extinct variety close to Chiquitano include bi 'genipa', masi 'squirrel', peni 'lizard', peta 'turtle, tortoise', jachi 'chicha leftover', jichi 'worm; jichi spirit', among many others.

Chapaco Spanish
This dialect is spoken mainly in the valleys and the Gran Chaco of the department of Tarija, but also in the region of Villa Abecia and Camargo (in the department of Chuquisaca), in the province of Sud Chichas (capital Tupiza), and in the Chaco regions of Chuquisaca and Santa Cruz. 
The second-person-singular voseo is in full use in Tupiza, in the west of Tarija, and in the rest of the aforementioned areas.
The Chapaco accent has an intonation similar to that of Jujuy, Salta, and Tucumán in Argentina, as the territory where it was spoken before was the Río de la Plata Province of Tarija. It has similar intonation throughout the Bolivian Chaco, Tupiza (Sud Chichas) and the Chuquisaca valleys of Camargo, Villa Abecia, Azurduy, Alcalá, etc.

Valluno Spanish
This variety is spoken in the departments of Cochabamba and Chuquisaca. It is somewhat similar to  Andean Spanish but differs in intonation and the use of idiomatic expressions, due to the mixture of Spanish and Quechua spoken in the valleys of Bolivia.

Tuteo or voseo
Because many institutions and companies use "tú" and the "tuteante" verb forms for the familiar second-person singular, it is common to encounter the erroneous statement that "tuteo" rather than "voseo" is the usual form in the speech of Bolivia.

Similarities in dialects
This chart shows the similarities between the dialects of Spanish spoken in Bolivia and those spoken in its neighboring Spanish-speaking countries Argentina, Chile, Peru, and Paraguay, as well as Portuguese spoken in neighboring Brazil.

References

Bibliography

External links 
 Languages of Bolivia (Radboud University of Nijmegen)

Spanish dialects of South America
Bolivian culture
Spanish